Mark Ronald Davis (born 12 October 1969) is an English footballer who played as a midfielder in the Football League for Darlington. In late February 1987, at the age of 17 years and 4 months, Wallsend-born youth trainee Davis made substitute appearances in the Third Division matches at home to York City and Bristol City; both matches were drawn.

References

1969 births
Living people
Sportspeople from Wallsend
Footballers from Tyne and Wear
English footballers
Association football midfielders
Darlington F.C. players
English Football League players